Codey is a given name and surname.  Notable people with the name include:

Given name
Codey McElroy (born 1992), American football player
Codey Maus (born 1985), Canadian curler 
Codey Rei (born 1989), New Zealand rugby union player

Surname
David Codey (born 1957), Australian rugby union player
Mary Jo Codey (born 1955), American healthcare activist 
Richard Codey (born 1946), American politician

See also
Cody (given name)
Cody (surname)